Alejandro "Álex" López Moreno (born 2 June 1997) is a Spanish footballer who plays as a central midfielder.

Club career
Born in Terrassa, Barcelona, Catalonia, López joined RCD Espanyol's youth setup in 2009, from UFB Jàbac Terrassa. He made his senior debut with the reserves on 2 November 2014, coming on as a second-half substitute for Julián Luque in a 1–2 Segunda División B away loss against Elche CF Ilicitano.

López was definitely promoted to the B-team in July 2016, and scored his first senior goal on 17 December of that year by netting the opener through a penalty kick in a 3–0 home defeat of CE Sabadell FC. On 11 July 2017, after suffering relegation, he renewed his contract until 2022.

On 28 May 2018, López was definitely promoted to the main squad in La Liga ahead of the 2018–19 campaign. He made his professional debut on 1 November, starting in a 1–2 away loss against Cádiz CF, for the season's Copa del Rey.

López made his La Liga debut on 14 January 2019, replacing fellow youth graduate Óscar Melendo late into a 2–3 loss at Real Sociedad. On 17 August, after featuring rarely, he was loaned to Segunda División side CD Lugo for the season.

López scored his first professional goal on 9 November 2019, netting the game's only in an away success over Albacete Balompié. Upon returning, he was assigned back to the main squad, but terminated his contract on 22 January 2021 after featuring in only 16 minutes during the campaign; the following day, he signed a 18-month contract with fellow second division side CD Mirandés.

References

External links

1997 births
Living people
Footballers from Terrassa
Spanish footballers
Association football midfielders
La Liga players
Segunda División B players
Tercera División players
RCD Espanyol B footballers
RCD Espanyol footballers
CD Lugo players
CD Mirandés footballers